The Arlington Aviators FC were an American indoor soccer team, founded in 2012. Arlington competed in the Western Indoor Soccer League (WISL) and PASL-Premier. Arlington played their home matches at the Soccer First Indoor Sports in Arlington, Washington.

The team is a former member of the Premier Arena Soccer League (2012-14).

Year-by-year

References

External links
Arlington Aviators official website
WISL official website

Indoor soccer clubs in the United States
Western Indoor Soccer League teams
Premier Arena Soccer League teams
2012 establishments in Washington (state)
Association football clubs established in 2012